ProGlycProt is a database of experimentally verified glycosites and glycoproteins of the prokaryotes.

See also
 glycoprotein

References

External links
 http://www.proglycprot.org/

Biological databases
Glycoproteins
Carbohydrate chemistry